40S ribosomal protein S5 is a ribosomal subunit of the Eukaryotic ribosome (80S) complex. In humans it is encoded by the RPS5 gene.

Ribosomes, the organelles that catalyze protein synthesis, in eukaryotes, consist of a small 40S subunit and a large 60S subunit (whereas prokaryotic ribosomes are 70 Svedberg units, composed of 50S and 30S subunits). They are located in the cytoplasm. Together these subunits are composed of four RNA species and approximately 80 structurally distinct proteins. This gene encodes a ribosomal protein that is a component of the eukaryotic 40S subunit. The protein belongs to the S7P family of ribosomal proteins.  Variable expression of this gene in colorectal cancers compared to adjacent normal tissues has been observed, although no correlation between the level of expression and the severity of the disease has been found. As is typical for genes encoding ribosomal proteins, there are multiple processed pseudogenes of this gene dispersed through the genome.

References

Further reading

External links 
 

Ribosomal proteins